Woodland Park, Alberta is a designated place and locality in Parkland County, Alberta.

Woodland Park, Alberta may also refer to:

Woodland Park, Ponoka County, Alberta, a locality in Ponoka County, Alberta
Woodland Park, Strathcona County, a locality in Strathcona County, Alberta